Peter of Siena may refer to:

Peter of Siena (died 1289)
Peter of Siena (died 1321)